Aad is a Dutch short version of the given name Adrianus/Adriaan . It is also a less common Norwegian given name.  People with this name include:

Aad Andriessen (1960–2021), Dutch footballer
Aad Bak (1926–2009), Dutch footballer
Aad de Bruyn (1910–1991), Dutch throwing athlete
Aad de Graaf (1939–1995), Dutch track cyclist
Aad Knutsson Gjelle (1768–1840), Norwegian cartographer
Aad van den Hoek (born 1951), Dutch cyclist
Aad de Hoop (born 1927), Dutch physicist and mathematician
Aad Jacobs (born 1936), Dutch businessman
Aad de Jong (1921–2003), Dutch footballer
Aad de Koning (1928–2010), Dutch speed skater
Aad Kosto (born 1938), Dutch politician
Aad Mansveld (1944–1991), Dutch footballer
Aad de Mos (born 1947), Dutch football coach
Aad Nuis (1933–2007), Dutch political scientist
Aad Oudt (born 1946), Dutch swimmer
Aad Steylen (born 1935), Dutch long-distance runner
Aad van Toor (born 1942), Dutch circus performer
Aad van der Vaart (born 1959), Dutch mathematician
Aad J. Vinje (1857–1929), Norwegian-born American justice
Aad Wagenaar (born 1940), Dutch politician
Aad van Wijngaarden (1916–1987), Dutch mathematician
Aad Zaanen (1913–2000), Dutch mathematician

See also
 ‘Ad, also Aad, great-grandson of Shem, son of Noah
 ʿĀd, also Aad, ancient Arab tribe, mentioned in Quran

Dutch masculine given names